Eye for an Eye is Beyond Twilight's (as Twilight) second album released in 1994.

Track listing

References 

Beyond Twilight albums
1994 albums